International relations between Armenia and India have been described as amicable. In 2022, it was reported that the two nations were exploring the possible of long-term military cooperation.

History

Early history
Armenians are believed to have traveled to India, when some Armenians joined the auxiliary elements of the forces under the command of Alexander the Great when he crossed Armenia en route to India. The earliest documented references to the mutual relationship of Armenians and Indians are found in Cyropaedia (Persian Expedition), an ancient Greek work by Xenophon (430 BC – 355 BC). These references indicate that several Armenians travelled to India, and they were well aware of land routes to reach India, as also the general and political geography, socio-cultural milieu, and economic life of the Indian subcontinent.

According to Zenob Glak, one of the first disciples of Gregory the Illuminator, the patron saint of Armenia, at least 7 Hindu cities were  established in Armenia sometime around 349 B.C. The institution of Nakharar was founded by Hindu Kings from even earlier. Zenob wrote that the colony was established by two Indian princes from Ujjain who had taken refuge in Armenia. They worshipped Ganesha and their descendants multiplied and ruled over a large part of Armenia. Under the Hindu rulers, the cities flourished until the dawn of Christianity in Armenia in 301 A.D.
The ruins of the Saint Karapet Monastery, now in Turkey,  stands at the site of the Hindu temples.
Literary evidence indicates the existence of Indian settlements in Armenia as early as 149 BC. The settlements were established in Taron, Greater Armenia (roughly corresponding to the Muş Province of present-day Turkey) by two Indian Princes, their families and retinue, on land provided by the then rulers of Armenia. 

An archive directory (published 1956) in Delhi states that Armenian merchant-cum-diplomat Thomas of Cana arrived on the Malabar Coast in 780 AD using the overland route. Thomas was an affluent merchant dealing chiefly in spices and muslins. He was also instrumental in obtaining a decree, inscribed on a copperplate, from the Chera Dynasty, which conferred several commercial, social and religious privileges for the regional Saint Thomas Christians. In current local references, Thomas of Cana is known as Knayi Thomman or Kanaj Tomma, meaning "Thomas the merchant". Armenians had trade relations with several parts of India, and by the 7th century a few Armenian settlements had appeared in the present-day state of Kerala on the Malabar Coast. Armenians controlled a large part of the international trade of the area, particularly in precious stones and quality fabrics.

Medieval history
Mughal emperor Akbar (1556–1605), invited Armenians to settle in Agra in the 16th century, and by the middle of the 19th century, Agra had a sizeable Armenian population. Armenian traders visited Agra during the Mughal Empire. By an imperial decree, Armenian merchants were exempted from paying taxes on the merchandise imported and exported by them, and they were also allowed to move around in the areas of the Mughal Empire where entry of foreigners was otherwise prohibited. In 1562, an Armenian Church was constructed in Agra. From the 16th century onwards, the Armenians (mostly from Persia) formed an important trading community in Surat, the most active Indian port of that period, located on the western coast of India. The port city of Surat used to have regular sea borne to and fro traffic of  merchant vessels from Basra (in present-day Iraq) and Bandar Abbas (in present-day Iran). Armenians built two Churches and a cemetery in Surat. A tombstone in the city, dating back to 1579, bears Armenian inscriptions. The second Church was built in 1778 and was dedicated to Mary. An Armenian language manuscript written in 1678, currently preserved in Saltikov-Shchedrin Library, St. Petersburg, has an account of a permanent colony of Armenians in Surat. The Armenians settled in Chinsurah, near Calcutta, West Bengal, and in 1697 built a Church there. This is the second oldest Church in Bengal and is still in well preserved on account of the care of the Calcutta Armenian Church Committee.

Modern history
Indian President Sarvepalli Radhakrishnan visited the Armenian Soviet Socialist Republic in September 1964, and Prime Minister Indira Gandhi visited in June 1976.

India recognized Armenia on 26 December 1991, three months after it declared independence from the Soviet Union. Diplomatic relations between India and Armenia were established on 31 August 1992. India opened its embassy in Yerevan on 1 March 1999. Armenia, which had opened an honorary consulate in April 1994, established its embassy in New Delhi in October 1999.

Armenian Presidents Levon Ter-Petrosyan and Robert Kocharyan visited India in 1995 and 2003 respectively.

In 2019 after an interview with WION, Prime Minister Nikol Pashinyan has stated that Armenia supports India in the Kashmir conflict between India and Pakistan.

Armenia signed an agreement to purchase four Swathi Weapon Locating Radars for US$40 million from India in March 2020. In September 2022, Armenia signed an agreement worth  to purchase four batteries of Pinaka multi-barrel rocket launchers, anti-tank rockets, and various types of ammunition from India.

Armenian community in India

Indian community in Armenia

See also
 Armenian Church, Chennai
 Armenian Church of St. John the Baptist
 Armenian cemetery in Hyderabad
 Armenians in India
 Hinduism in Armenia
 India-Russia relations
 Pakistan-Armenia relations

References

 
India
Bilateral relations of India